The Château du Bousquet is a castle in the commune of Arcambal in the Lot département of France.

The origins of the castle date back to the 11th century. The keep, which does not appear to have been altered, dates from this time. Alterations were made in the 13th, 15th, 16th and 17th centuries. The castle was burned on three occasions. Legend has it that the castle was a former commandery of the Knights of Malta. This is false, but there is no doubt that one of the seigneurs was a Knight of Malta. Situated on a promontory dominating the Lot River, the edifice has kept in its western side its medieval fortified silhouette, with irregular circular towers. The interior still has a Gothic stone staircase and a hall vaulted with crossed ogives, one of which has an unusual shape to allow for the opening of window.

The castle is privately owned and is not open to the public. It has been listed since 1979 as a monument historique by the French Ministry of Culture.

Gallery

See also
List of castles in France

References

External links
 

Castles in Lot
Châteaux in Lot (department)
Monuments historiques of Lot (department)